Fuego is the Spanish word for "fire". It may also refer to:

Places 
Volcán de Fuego, a stratovolcano in Guatemala
Tierra del Fuego, an archipelago off the southern tip of South America
Punta Fuego, a headland in the Philippines

Music 
Fuego (singer) (born 1981; Miguel Duran Jr.), a Dominican American merengue singer-songwriter
Fuego (XM), a Reggaeton/Hispanic rhythmic music channel on XM Satellite Radio

Albums
Fuego (Donald Byrd album), 1960
Fuego, 2006 album by Juan Carlos Alvarado
Fuego (Kumbia Kings album), 2004
Fuego (La Secta album), 2008
Fuego (Menudo album), 1981
Fuego (Phish album), 2014

Songs
"Fuego" (The Cheetah Girls song), 2007
"Fuego" (Eleni Foureira song), 2018
"Fuego" (DJ Snake, Sean Paul and Anitta song), 2019
"Fuego", a 2002 instrumental by Bond from the album Shine
"Fuego", a 2004 song by Kumbia Kings from their album Fuego
"Fuego", a 2006 song by Pitbull from his album El Mariel
"Fuego", a 2014 song by Phish from their album Fuego
"Fuego", a 2014 song by Viza
"Fuego", a 2019 song by Ximena Sariñana from ¿Dónde Bailarán las Niñas?

Films 
Fuego (1969 film), a 1969 Argentine sexploitation film
Fuego (2007 film), a 2007 action thriller

Other uses 
Fire Urgency Estimator in Geosynchronous Orbit, or FUEGO, an experimental technology to detect wildfires
Renault Fuego, an automobile produced by Renault from 1980 to 1992
Fuego (comics), a fictional supervillain in the Marvel Comics Universe
Fuego, a business process management software company acquired by BEA Systems
Fuego (wrestler) (born 1981), a Mexican professional wrestler